The Mayor of Kilkenny is an honorific title used by the head of Kilkenny Borough Council. The Council has jurisdiction throughout its administrative area which is the city of Kilkenny in the Republic of Ireland. The office was established in the 16th century and had significant powers. The office was all but abolished under the Local Government Act 2001. All that remains of the office, per section 11 of the Act is a symbolic role: "Subject to this Act, royal charters and letters patent relating to local authorities shall continue to apply for ceremonial and related purposes in accordance with local civic tradition but shall otherwise cease to have effect.". The Act goes on to state the chairman of the Council must be styled the Cathaoirleach and that "Any reference in any other enactment to the lord mayor, mayor, chairman, deputy lord mayor, deputy mayor or vice-chairman or cognate words shall, where the context so requires, be read as a reference to the Cathaoirleach or Leas-Chathaoirleach or other title standing for the time being." (section 31 (3)).

History of the office
Kilkenny's first Council was elected in 1231 and since then Kilkenny has had a continuous record of municipal government. From the 13th century to the end of the 16th the chief magistrate was known as the Sovereign, and since then Mayor. The Cathaoirleach for the civic year 2012/2013 was Councillor Sean O' hArgain. John Coonan was elected Mayor in 2020, succeeding Martin Brett.

List of sovereigns 

 1282 Richard Palmer 
 1289 Richard de Lega 
 1293 Alan Donninge 
 1295 Alan Donninge 
 1296 John White
 1300 Robert de Edesor 
 1301 William Outlaw, son of Alice Kyteler
 1303 Robert de Edesor 
 1305 Alan Donninge 
 1307 John White 
 1310 William Outlaw
 1311 Henry Outlaw 
 1312 Alan Donnynge 
 1314 Phillip Croker 
 1315 Nicholas Croker 
 1316-17 John Godyn 
 1318 John Enocke (Eynow) 
 1319 John Godyn 
 1320 John Enocke 
 1321 Thomas de Ley
 1322 John Enocke
 1323-24 William Donninge 
 1326-28 William Fitz Geoffrey 
 1329 John Folyn
 1330 Thomas Shortall 
 1331-32 Bartholomew Folyn 
 1333 Thomas Oweyn 
 1334 Walter FitzHugh 
 1335-36 Gilbert Fort 
 1337-38 John Cross 
 1339 Nicholas Bristow
 1340 John Alyn
 1341-43 John Cross
 1345 Nicholas Bristow
 1346-47 John Cross
 1348 Thomas Venn
 1349-50 John Enocke
 1351 William Folyn
 1352 John Enocke
 1353 James Oweyn
 1356 William Lofe
 1357 John Rennell
 1360 John Whyte de Ely
 1364 John Enocke
 1366 David Archer
 1367-68 William Tirrell
 1369 Robert Dencourt
 1370 William Bristowe
 1371 Oliver Knaresborough
 1372 Robert Flood
 1373 Robert Dencourt
 1374-75 Robert Talbot
 1376-77 David Archer
 1379-80 Oliver Knaresborough
 1381 Patrick Catermas
 1383 John Cadde
 1384-85 Nicholas Ley
 1386 Robert Talbot
 1387 John Lumbard
 1388 Richard Norton
 1389 Robert Folyn
 1390 John Dyer
 1391 John Chamberlain
 1392 Thomas Knaresborough
 1393 Thomas Taylor
 1394 Phillip Cadde
 1395 John Daniell
 1396 William Stone
 1397 Nicholas White
 1398 William Stone
 1399 Richard Talbot
 1400 Thomas Knaresborough
 1401 Robert Dullard
 1402 Thomas Talbot
 1403 Thomas Rothe, son of John Rothe
 1404 Richard Talbot
 1405 Roger Bernard
 1406 John Marshall
 1407 John Croker
 1408-10 Nicholas Stokes
 1411 Robert Taine
 1412 John Shortall/Thomas English, alias Mownister
 1416 John Lumbard
 1417 Thomas Chamberlain
 1418 John Marshall
 1419 Thomas White
 1420 David Girdler, alias Browne
 1421 Robert Folyn
 1422 Nicholas White
 1424 John Coke
 1425 William Archer
 1427 John Knaresborough
 1428 Maurice Stafford
 1429 John Marshall
 1430 Thomas English alias Mownister
 1431 Nicholas Sutton
 1432 John Knaresborough
 1433 John Marshall
 1434 William Archer
 1435 William White
 1438 John Archer
 1440 John Roth(e)
 1431 Walter Sherlock
 1432 John Knaresborough
 1433 Robert Savage
 1434-35 John Whiteside
 1436 Elias Archer
 1449 John Rothe
 1450 Patrick Sentleger
 1451 John Knaresborough
 1452 John Ragget(t)
 1457 John Gerrot
 1460 Thomas Sherlock for Elias Archer who refused to serve
 1464 William Archer
 1465 John Rothe
 1466 William Archer Fitz Elias (i.e. son of Elias Archer)
 1467-68 Walter Archer
 1471 Patrick Daniell
 1473 John Rothe
 1475 Thomas Sherlock served for John Folyng of Drogheda
 1477 John Whiteside 
 1482-83 John Knaresborough
 1486 John Sherlock
 1487 Robert Leonard
 1489 Nicholas Ragget
 1490 John Mothell
 1491-92 Denis Maldony
 1493, 1494, 1496 Robert Shee (died 1500 in the Battle at Moyaliff, Co. Tipperary)
 1498 Peter Archer
 1499 John Archer
 1500 Thomas Marshall
 1501 John Savage
 1502 Walter Sherlock
 1503 Patrick Archer
 1504 William Kyrdow
 1505 Robert Rothe
 1506 Richard Rothe
 1507 Walter Courcy 
 1508 Patrick Archer 
 1509 Robert Rothe 
 1510 Robert Rothe 
 1511 Thomas Langton 
 1512 Walter Sherlock Fitz Thomas 
 1513 Thomas Mothell 
 1514 Robert Rothe 
 1515 David Savage 
 1516 Walter Courcy 
 1517 Geoffrey Rothe 
 1518 Patrick Archer 
 1519 Thomas Mothell 
 1520 Peter Archer 
 1521 Peter Archer 
 1522 Richard Shee, son of Robert (see 1493), married to Joan Archer of New Ross
 1523 Robert Rothe 
 1524 Thomas Shee 
 1525 Richard Rothe 
 1526 Nicholas Hackett 
 1527 John Walsh FitzLawrence 
 1528 Geoffrey Rothe 
 1529 Peter Walsh 
 1530 Thomas Shee
 1531 John Rothe 
 1532 Richard Shee 
 1533 Geoffrey Rothe as locum tenens for Oliver Sentleger Lord of Tullchanbrog 
 1534 Nicholas Hackett 
 1535 Thomas Langton 
 1536 Richard Shee 
 1537 Robert Rothe 
 1538 John Walsh
 1539 John Rothe 
 1540 Nicholas Cowley 
 1541 David Rothe 
 1542 Walter Archer 
 1543 Robert Shee, MP, son of Richard Shee (see 1522) and Joan Archer, married to Margaret Rothe, father of Sir Richard Shee and Henry Shee (see 1610)
 1544 Walter Archer 
 1545 Walter Lawless 
 1546 David Rothe 
 1547 Francis Droone 
 1548 William Shee
 1549 John Langton
 1550 David Rothe
 1551 Nicholas Cowley
 1552 Robert Shee
 1553 William Shee
 1554 Walter Mothell
 1555 John Marshall
 1556 Walter Mothell
 1557 John Langton
 1558 Nicholas Garvey
 1566 William Archer
 1572 Helias (Elias) Shee
 1577 Walter Archer
 1578 Edward Langton
 1579 Peter Shee
 1580 John Archer
 1581 Robert Shee
 1582 Thomas Raghton (Rafter?)
 1583-84 Arthur Shee
 1585 Richard Ragget
 1586 Arthur Shee
 1589 Thomas Raghton (Rafter?)
 1590 Walter Archer
 1591 Arthur Shee
 1592 Richard Ragget
 1593 John Archer
 1594 Helias (Elias) Shee
 1595 Henry Shee (his coat of arms can still be seen in St. Kieran St, Kilkenny)
 1596 Geoffrey Rothe
 1597 Thomas Archer
 1598 Edward Langton
 1599 Helias Shee
 1600 Henry Shee
 1601 Patrick Archer
 1602 Luke Shee
 1603 Martin Archer (his coat of arms with the inscription "Insignia Martini Archer, Kilkenny, 1582." can still be found on a house on High St, Kilkenny)
 1604 Edward Rothe
 1605 John Rothe Fitz Piers of Rothe House, great-great grandson of Sovereign John Rothe 1440
 1606 Nicholas Langton
 1607 Edward Shee
 1608 Thomas Ley

List of mayors since 1609 

 1609 Thomas Ley (died 1629) until Michaelmas, then Robert Rothe
 1610 Henry Shee, grandson of Richard (see 1522), married first to Frances Crisp and second to a lady White; built the house on High Street which is now the restaurant Paris Texas and still bears his and his wives' coat of arms
 1611 Thomas Archer removed, then Patrick Archer, MP
 1612 Edward Rothe
 1613 John Rothe Fitzpiers of Rothe House, then Nicholas Langton (1562-1632)
 1614 Edward Shee
 1615 Luke Shee
 1616 John Rothe Fitzpiers, then David Rothe
 1617 Clement Raggett
 1618 William Shee
 1619 Clement Raggett
 1620 Sir Cyprian Horsfall
 1621 Walter Archer
 1622 Walter Lawless
 1623 Thomas Shee
 1624 Walter Archer (died Jan. 1626), William Shee
 1626 Michael Cowley
 1627 Richard Rothe
 1628 Henry Archer
 1629 Peter Rothe (son of John Rothe Fitzpiers) of Rothe House (died 1654 in exile), MP, married to Letitia Lawless, daughter of Walter
 1630 John Shea
 1631 Marcus Shee, son of Sir Richard Shee
 1632 William Shee
 1633 Robert Shee, MP, son of Henry Shee and Dorothy Shee, great-grandson of Henry Shee (see 1610)
 1634 Thomas Archer 
 1635 Richard Lawless, son of Walter Lawless
 1636 James Cowley
 1637 Nicholas Knaresborough, married to Rose Rothe
 1638 George Shee
 1639 Michael Archer Young
 1640 George Shee
 1641 Thomas Archer
 1642 Patrick Murphy 
 1643 Walter Archer
 1644 Peter Shee
 1645 William Langton
 1646 Jenkin Rothe
 1647 Richard Shea FitzMarcus
 1648 Robert Rothe
 1649 James Archdekin
 1650 Elias Shee
 1651 Peter Rothe FitzEdward, MP died, replaced by ? Shee
 1652 James Bjrogan (?)
 1653 Elias Shee
 1654-55 Daniel Axtell, military governor
 1656 Abel Warren, MP
 1657 Thomas Addams
 1658 John Addams
 1659 Thomas Evans
 1660 John Joyner or Jaynor
 1661 Thomas Evans
 1662 Thomas Butler
 1663 William Warden
 1664-65 Peter Goodwin
 1666-68 Thomas Evans
 1669-70 Thomas Burrell
 1671-72 William Connell
 1673-75 Josias Haydock
 1676-77 Francis Rowledge
 1678 Joseph Cuffe
 1679 Arthur Helsham died / Thomas Young
 1680 John Baxter
 1681 Samuel Phillips
 1682 Bartholomew Connor (?)
 1683 Thomas Butler
 1684 Thomas Longueville
 1685-86 Richard Connell, MP
 1687-88 John Rothe (Catholic), MP
 1689 John Archdekin
 1690 July-91 John Baxter 
 1692-93 Joshua Helsham 
 1694-95 Ebenezer Warren, MP
 1696 John Pape
 1697 Isaac Mukins
 1698 Thomas Phillips
 1699 George Birch
 1700 Abel Butler
 1701 Josias Haydock
 1702 John Blunden
 1703 Patrick Connell
 1704 William Earl of Inchiquin
 1705 John Hamilton
 1706 John Garnett
 1707 Adam Haydock
 1708-09 Stephen Haydock
 1710 Robert Connell
 1711 William Baxter
 1712 Edward Evans
 1713 Thomas Blunt
 1714 William Baxter
 1715 James Agar
 1716 John Birch
 1717 John Dessaroy
 1718 John Cooksey
 1719 John Blunden
 1720 Enoch Collier
 1721 John Cuffe
 1722 Richard Phillips
 1723 Thomas Sandford of Sandfordscourt
 1724 Edward Warren
 1725 Arthur Helsham
 1726 Thomas Butler
 1727 Thomas Barnes
 1728-29 John Blunden (c. 1695 – 1752)
 1730 Stephen Haydock / Edward Warren
 1731 William Gore, MP
 1732 Edward Evans
 1733 Edward Warren, MP
 1734 Henry Evans
 1735 Richard Butler
 1736 Algernon Warren
 1737 George St. George of Kilrush
 1738 Thomas Butler
 1739 Arthur Helsham
 1740 William Gore (1703–1748)
 1741 Ebenezer Lodge
 1742 Anthony Blunt
 1743 Barry Colles
 1744 Samuel Matthews
 1745-46 Ambrose Evans
 1747 Joseph Evans
 1748 Joseph Blunt
 1749 Ambrose Evans
 1750 Ebenezer Lodge
 1751 Ralph Gore
 1752 Harvy Morres
 1753 John Blunden (c.1718-1783), MP
 1754 William Evans Morres, MP
 1755 William Colles, father of Abraham Colles
 1756 George Carpenter
 1757 James Percival
 1758 Thomas Butler
 1759 Charles Gore
 1760 Anthony Blunt
 1761 Thomas Wilkinson
 1762 Anthony Blunt
 1763 John Blunt
 1764 Francis Lodge
 1765 Barry Colles
 1766 Haydocke Evans Morres, MP
 1767 Thomas Butler
 1768 John Watters
 1769 Christopher Hewetson
 1770 Anthony Blunt the younger 
 1771 Otway Lord Desart
 1772 Francis Lodge
 1773 Ralph Gore
 1774 Thomas Mossom
 1775 John Watters 
 1776 Patrick Welch, MP
 1777 Clayton Bayly 
 1778 John Earl of Wandesford
 1779 Otway Lord Desart
 1780 Thomas Butler
 1781 Henry Geale
 1782 Bibby Hartford
 1783 Edward Evans
 1784 Edmund Butler
 1785 Patrick Welch
 1786 Edmund Butler
 1787 Patrick Welch the younger, MP
 1788 James Wemys
 1789 Henry Shearman
 1790 Robert Edmonds
 1791 Patrick Welch the elder
 1792 Edmund Butler
 1793 Robert Edmunds
 1794 James Wemys
 1795 Robert Edmonds
 1796 William Wilkinson
 1797 William Kingsmill
 1798 Robert Edmonds
 1799 William Pitt Blunden
 1800 Robert Edmonds
 1801 Sir John Blunden
 1802 John Enery
 1803 Samuel Matthews
 1804 John Helsham
 1805 Rev. Edward Herbert
 1806 Walter, Earl of Ormonde
 1807 The Hon. Hamilton Cuffe
 1808 The Hon. James Butler
 1809 John Otway Cuffe, 2nd Earl of Desart
 1810 George Rothe
 1811 James Wemys
 1812 William Bayly
 1813 Samuel Matthews
 1814 The Hon. James Butler
 1815 Rev. Nicholas Herbert
 1816 The Hon. Charles Butler
 1817 Samuel Madden
 1818 John Kinchela 
 1819 William Hartford
 1820 Nathaniel Alcock
 1821 Henry Wemys
 1822 Joseph Bradish
 1823 Sir Jonah Wheeler Denny Cuffe
 1824 Joseph Greene 
 1825 Charles Madden
 1826 Christopher Humfrey / Joseph Bradish
 1827 William Kingsmill / Charles Madden 1868 William O'Donnell
 1828 Nathaniel Alcock
 1829 William Oliver Wheeler
 1830 Henry Gore
 1831 William Robertson
 1832 Thomas Cronyn
 1833 John McCraith
 1834 William Grace
 1835 Parr Kingsmill
 1836 Redmond Reade first Roman Catholic Mayor since 1690)
 1837 Richard Sullivan
 1838 Thomas Pack
 1839 William Shanahan
 1840 Lewis Chapelier Kinchela Sr.
 1841 Lewis Chapelier MD
 1842-43 James Burnham
 1844 Edmond Smithwick
 1845 Robert Cane (1807–1858)
 1846 Joseph Hackett
 1847 Henry Potter
 1848 Thomas Hart
 1849 Robert Cane
 1850 Michael Banim
 1851 Michael Hyland
 1852 Daniel Cullen
 1853 John Potter
 1854 Michael Sullivan
 1855 James M. Tidmarsh
 1856 William Lanigan
 1857 Daniel Smithwick
 1858 Patrick Moran
 1859 Matthew Rowan
 1860 Edmund Murphy
 1861 Thomas Power
 1862-63 Alexander Colles
 1864-65 Edmond Smithwick
 1866 John Feehan
 1867 John Buggy
 1868 William O'Donnell
 1869 William Healy
 1870 James W. Sullivan
 1871 William Hayden
 1872-73 William Kenealy
 1874 Patrick Murphy
 1875 Simon Morris
 1876 Peter McDermott
 1877 Arthur M. Mahon
 1878 Daniel McCarthy
 1879 James S. Loughlin
 1880 Andrew Dowling
 1881 Patrick Maher
 1882 Simon Morris
 1883 John Hogan
 1884 John E. Smithwick, MP (1844-1913)
 1885 William O'Donnell
 1886 James Walsh
 1887-88 Patrick M. Egan, father of the playwright Michael Egan
 1889 John Coyle
 1890 David Fenton
 1891 Michael Kennedy
 1892 Patrick Rowan
 1893 Cornelius Quinn
 1894-95 Patrick J. Morrissey
 1896 Major O'Leary
 1897 Thomas Cantwell
 1898 John A. Healy
 1899 Patrick J. O'Keeffe 
 1900-1901 Joseph Purcell
 1902-03 Patrick Hoyne 
 1904-05 Edward O'Shea
 1906 Edward McSweeney
 1907-08 Captain Otway Cuffe
 1909-10 Michael J. Potter
 1911 Thomas Cantwell
 1912-13 Joseph Purcell
 1914-16 John Magennis
 1917-18 John Slater
 1919-24 Peter DeLoughrey
 1925-27 James Reade
 1926 James Reade
 1927 James Reade
 1928 John Magennis
 1929-1930 John G. Duggan
 1931 T.J.D. O'Hanrahan
 1932-34 Michael McSweeney
 1935-36 Patrick Bryan
 1937-38 John Magennis
 1939-42 Raymond Crotty
 1943-44 Commissioner
 1945-46 Patrick J. Crotty
 1947 James P. Pattison
 1948 Thomas J. DeLoughrey
 1949 James Monahan
 1950-51 John Leahy
 1952-55 Patrick Gleeson
 1956 John J. Holohan
 1957-58 Michael J. McGuinness
 1959 John J. Holohan
 1960 Seamus Monahan
 1961 John J. Holohan
 1962 Patrick Kinchella
 1963-64 Tomás Ó Dubhshláine
 1965-66 Michael J. McGuinness
 1967 Thomas Martin 
 1968 John J. Holohan
 1969-70 Margaret Tynan (First woman elected Mayor) 
 1970 Margaret Tynan 
 1971 Kieran Crotty 
 1972 Kieran Crotty 
 1973 Michael J. McGuinness 
 1974 Thomas Martin 
 1975 John J. Holohan 
 1976 Seamus Pattison 
 1977 Margaret Tynan 
 1978 Luke Boyle 
 1979 Thomas Martin 
 1980 Kieran Crotty
 1981 Luke Boyle
 1982 John J. Holohan 
 1983 Thomas Crotty 
 1984 Michael J. McGuinness 
 1985-88 Margaret Tynan
 1989-90 Kieran Crotty
 1991 Thomas Crotty
 1992 Seamus Pattison
 1993 Michael J. McGuinness
 1994 Michael Lanigan
 1995 Kieran Crotty
 1996 John J. McGuinness, son of Michael J. McGuinness
 1997 Margaret Tynan
 1998 Tomás Ó Dublshláine / John Bolger
 1999 Tony Patterson
 2000 Paul Cuddihy
 2001 Joe Cody
 2002 Betty Manning
 2003 Pat Crotty
 2004 Martin Brett
 2005 Marie Fitzpatrick
 2006 Martin Brett
 2007 Marie Fitzpatrick
 2008 Pat Crotty
 2009 Malcolm Noonan (Green Party)
 2010 Martin Brett
 2011 David FitzGerald
 2012 Sean O' hArgain
 2014-15 Andrew McGuinness, son of John J. McGuinness
 2016 Patrick O'Neill (Fine Gael)
 2017 Michael Doyle (Fine Gael)
 2018 Peter "Chap" Cleere (Fine Fáil)
 2019 Martin Brett
 2020 John Coonan
 2021 Andrew McGuinness
 2022 David FitzGerald

See also
 List of cities in Ireland
 Lord Mayor of Dublin
 Lord Mayor of Cork
 County Kilkenny

Notes

External links 
  List of Sovereigns and Mayors of Kilkenny Kilkenny Borough Council website

References 

Liber Primus Kilkenniensis, translated by Jocelyn Otway-Ruthven, Kilkenny 1961
MS 2513 in the National Library. (Alderman Connells Book)
Manuscripts 105 and 106, Gilbert Collection in the Dublin City Archives. (Rothes Register)
Genealogical Memoirs of the Members of Parliament for the County And City of Kilkenny - George Dames Burtchaell, Dublin 1888
Rothes Register of the Antiquities and Statutes of the Town of Kilkenny, Appendix to the second report of the Historical Manuscripts Commission. p. 257, article by J.T. Gilbert

 Kilkenny

History of County Kilkenny
Kilkenny (city)
Politics of County Kilkenny